Curculionichthys coxipone is a species of catfish in the family Loricariidae. It is native to South America, where it occurs in the drainage basins of the Cuiabá River and the Paraguay River. It reaches 3 cm (1.2 inches) SL. The species was described in 2015 by Fábio Fernandes Roxo, Gabriel Souza da Costa e Silva, Luz E. Orrego, and Claudio Oliveira, alongside the description of the genus Curculionichthys to include several species formerly classified in the genus Hisonotus.

References 

Loricariidae
Fish described in 2015
Catfish of South America